Édouard-Jean-Étienne Deligny (12 December 1815 – February 1902) was a French general.

1815 births
1902 deaths
French generals
Grand Croix of the Légion d'honneur
People of the French Third Republic
People of the Second French Empire
École Spéciale Militaire de Saint-Cyr alumni